Yokohama photographs also known as Herbert Geddes collection or Life in Japan, ca. 1910 is a collection of photographic glass-plate transparencies collected by Canadian Herbert Geddes in the beginning of the 20th century. The collection is stored in the University of Victoria.

Herbert Geddes 
Herbert Geddes (1877-1970) worked for G.R. Gregg and Company in Vancouver and Winnipeg. He was sent by the company to Japan, and lived in Yokohama for ten years, from 1908 to 1918. He worked as a manager for the company to mid-1950s.

Collection 
Glass-plates depicting life in Japan were sold to foreigners between 1868 and 1912. Plates in Geddes' collection include "scenery, street scenes, workers, farming, fishing, silk production, stone carvers, wood carvers, metal workers, potters, and artists". Glass-plates were colored by hand. As noted by Clémence Leleu for PEN online, "This was a very popular practice, which, in the specific case of glass-plate photographs, made it possible to add density and variable contours to the subject through the use of transparency and variations in brightness."

Gallery

Further reading 
 Meiji no Nihon: Yokomana shashin no sekai: Saishoku arubamu. Yokohama-shi Yurindo, 1990. (Meiji Japan in tinted album: the world of Yokohama photographs)

References

External links 

Collection online at the University of Victoria website

Photographic collections and books
Images of Japan